Joan Batista Sanxo, or Juan Bautista Sancho, composer and scholar (Artà, Majorca, Spain, 1772 or 1776 — Mission San Antonio de Padua, California, 1830). He brought to California some of the first samples of 18th-century European music, including sacred plainchant, sacred polyphony, as well as opera excerpts and instrumental arrangements with basso continuo. In 1803, he arrived in Mexico from his native Majorca and, in 1804, he settled in Mission San Antonio, where he remained until his death in 1830. He co-wrote a curious Interrogatorio, reporting on the conditions of the natives, their social customs, their local flora, and even their music. He also compiled vocabularies of several of their languages. As a composer, his Misa en Sol and Misa de los Angeles are among his best works.

See also
Magin Catalá
José Francisco Ortega

Bibliography
 Craig H. Russell, From Serra to Sancho: Music and Pageantry in the California Missions, (Oxford: Oxford University Press, 2009).  
 Antoni Pizà, ed.; William J. Summers; Craig H. Russell; Antoni Gili:  J.B. Sancho: Pioneer Composer of California, Palma:  Universitat de les Illes Balears, 2007. 

1770s births
1830 deaths
People from Mallorca
Spanish composers
Spanish male composers
Musicians from the Balearic Islands